Douglas William Small (born 1965) is a rear admiral and the Commander, Naval Information Warfare Systems Command.

Career
A native of Birchwood, Wisconsin, Small served aboard the  during the Gulf War. During the Iraq War, he served with the Joint CREW Composite Squadron One. Eventually, Small was named executive assistant to Assistant Secretary of the Navy (Research, Development and Acquisition) Sean Stackley.

Small became program executive officer for integrated warfare systems in 2016.

Awards 
Small has received the Distinguished Service Medal, the Legion of Merit, the Bronze Star Medal, the Defense Meritorious Service Medal and the Army Meritorious Unit Commendation.

Education
Marquette University, B.S. in physics (1988)
Naval Postgraduate School, Ph.D. in physics (1997)

References

1965 births
Living people
Place of birth missing (living people)
People from Washburn County, Wisconsin
Marquette University alumni
Military personnel from Wisconsin
United States Navy personnel of the Gulf War
Naval Postgraduate School alumni
American physicists
United States Navy personnel of the Iraq War
Recipients of the Legion of Merit
United States Navy rear admirals (upper half)
Recipients of the Navy Distinguished Service Medal